The 1968–69 Divizia B was the 29th season of the second tier of the Romanian football league system.

The format has been maintained to two series, but the number of teams was expanded, each of the series having 16 teams, instead of 14. At the end of the season the winners of the series promoted to Divizia A and the last two places from each series relegated to Divizia C.

Team changes

To Divizia B
Promoted from Divizia C
 Oțelul Galați
 Dunărea Giurgiu
 Electroputere Craiova
 Medicina Cluj
 Progresul Brăila
 Metalul Turnu Severin
 Gloria Bârlad

Relegated from Divizia A
 Steagul Roșu Brașov

From Divizia B
Relegated to Divizia C
 Victoria Roman
 Chimica Târnăveni

Promoted to Divizia A
 Politehnica Iași
 Vagonul Arad
 ASA Crișul Oradea

League tables

Serie I

Serie II

See also 
 1968–69 Divizia A
 1968–69 Divizia C
 1968–69 County Championship

References

Liga II seasons
Romania
2